Studyony is a rural locality (a khutor) in Prokhorovsky District, Belgorod Oblast, Russia. The population was 11 in 2010. There are two streets.

Geography 
Studyony is located 30 km east of Prokhorovka (the district's administrative centre) by road. Kholodnoye is the nearest rural locality.

References 

Rural localities in Prokhorovsky District